Colin Edwards (5 May 1991 – 16 February 2013) was a  Guyanese international football player. He played in three friendly games for the Guyana national football team.

On 5 February 2013, Edwards was involved in a motorcycle accident in Georgetown. He remained unconscious until he died on 16 February 2013 in the Intensive Care Unit (ICU) of the Georgetown Public Hospital.

International appearances 

Source:

References

1991 births
Association football goalkeepers
2013 deaths
Sportspeople from Georgetown, Guyana
Guyana international footballers
Guyanese footballers
Road incident deaths in Guyana
Motorcycle road incident deaths
TT Pro League players
Morvant Caledonia United players
Guyanese expatriate footballers
Guyanese expatriate sportspeople in Trinidad and Tobago